Dato' Masir anak Kujat (born 7 August 1954) is a Malaysian politician of Iban descent. He has served as Member of Parliament (MP) for Sri Aman from March 2008 until November 2022. 

He has been a member of the Parti Sarawak Bersatu (PSB) since 7 March 2019. He left PSB to become an independent MP on March 2022. Masir lost his Sri Aman federal seat on the November 2022 Malaysian general election to Doris Sophia Brodie from Gabungan Parti Sarawak in a 4-way fight.

He previously served as Deputy Minister of Home Affairs II in the Barisan Nasional (BN) administration under former Prime Minister Najib Razak and former Minister Ahmad Zahid Hamidi from July 2015 to the power loss of BN coalition in May 2018. He was a member of Parti Rakyat Sarawak (PRS), a former component party of Barisan Nasional (BN) and now Gabungan Parti Sarawak (GPS) coalitions, from 2008 to 2019.

Election results

Honours

Honours of Malaysia
  :
  Companion of the Order of the Defender of the Realm (JMN) (2015)
  :
  Knight Companion of the Order of the Crown of Pahang (DIMP) - Dato' (2017)

References

1954 births
Living people
People from Sarawak
Iban people
Parti Rakyat Sarawak politicians
Members of the Dewan Rakyat
Companions of the Order of the Defender of the Realm
21st-century Malaysian politicians